The 1984 Eastbourne International was a women's tennis tournament played on outdoor grass courts at Devonshire Park in Eastbourne, United Kingdom that was part of the 1984 Virginia Slims World Championship Series. The tournament was held from 18 June until 24 June 1984. First-seeded Martina Navratilova won the singles title.

Finals

Singles
 Martina Navratilova defeated  Kathy Jordan 6–4, 6–1
 It was Navratilova's 6th singles title of the year and the 92nd of her career.

Doubles
 Martina Navratilova /  Pam Shriver defeated  Jo Durie /  Ann Kiyomura 6–4, 6–2
 It was Navratilova's 10th title of the year and the 191st of her career. It was Shriver's 8th title of the year and the 57th of her career.

References

External links
 International Tennis Federation (ITF) tournament edition details

Eastbourne International
Eastbourne International
Eastbourne International
Eastbourne International
1984 in English women's sport